Port Louisa Township is a township in Louisa County, Iowa.

History
Port Louisa Township was organized in 1856.

References

Townships in Louisa County, Iowa
Townships in Iowa